James William Arthur "Jim" Garner (born August 19, 1944) is a Canadian farmer, rancher and former political figure in Saskatchewan, Canada. He represented Wilkie from 1978 to 1986 in the Legislative Assembly of Saskatchewan as a Progressive Conservative.

He was born in Wilkie, Saskatchewan, the son of William J. Garner and Lillian Brown, and was educated there. In 1967, he married Marie Angeline Harriet Skeates. Garner was defeated by Linda Clifford when he ran for the Wilkie seat in the Saskatchewan assembly in 1975; he defeated Clifford to win the seat in 1978. Garner served in the provincial cabinet as Minister of Highways. He resigned from cabinet after it was revealed that he had diverted a Saskatchewan government plane to Unity to take him and his family to Regina. Garner did not run for reelection in 1986.

References

1944 births
Living people
Progressive Conservative Party of Saskatchewan MLAs
Members of the Executive Council of Saskatchewan
People from Rural Municipality Buffalo No. 409, Saskatchewan